Islams and Modernities is a book by Aziz al-Azmeh, a professor at Central European University in Budapest, Hungary. It was released in 1993. The book explores the history of interaction between Islam and Europe, analyzing myths about those interactions created by Orientalist and Islamist viewpoints. A new version was released on August 7, 2009, also examining "the discourse surrounding Islamism and irrationalism after 9/11."

Reception

The Guardian  wrote that "Islams and Modernities raises urgent questions that are central to the concerns of the contemporary world.”  New Statesman wrote that “Aziz Al-Azmeh is perhaps the most original thinker on these themes in Britain today."

Versions 
First edition: 
2009 edition:

See also

1996 in literature 
Islamic literature

References

External links
Profile of the book at Penguin Random House

Modernity
Liberal and progressive movements within Islam
Modernity
Modernity
1996 non-fiction books
Books about Islam and society
Islamic studies books
Islamism
Islamic studies
Verso Books books